N-Methylmaleimide (NMM) is a naturally-occurring organic compound with the formula of C5H5NO2.

Spectrum 
The 1H NMR spectrum of N-methylmaleimide contains two signals:  one for the hydrogen atoms of the methyl group and one for the vinylic hydrogen atoms.

References

Maleimides